Jewtopia is a 2012 independent comedy film, an adaptation of a long-running off-Broadway play. The film is directed by Bryan Fogel and written by Bryan Fogel and Sam Wolfson. It stars Jennifer Love Hewitt, Ivan Sergei, Joel David Moore, and Nicollette Sheridan.

Plot 
Christian O’Connell has met the girl of his dreams in Allison Marx. Unfortunately, Christian told Allison (who happens to be a rabbi’s daughter) that his name was Avi Rosenberg, and that he was Jewish—neither of which is true. Desperate to keep up the illusion, he turns to his childhood best friend, Adam Lipschitz, to teach him how to "act Jewish", but Adam has problems of his own, with a fiancée pushing him closer to a mental breakdown as their wedding approaches. With the best intentions, Adam and Christian attempt to help each other out, but things quickly get out of hand.

Cast 
 Jennifer Love Hewitt as Allison Marks
 Ivan Sergei as Christian O'Connell
 Joel David Moore as Adam Lipschitz
 Wendie Malick as Marci Marks
 Crystal Reed as Rebecca Ogin
 Peter Stormare as Buck O'Connell
 Nicollette Sheridan as Betsy O'Connell
 Lin Shaye as Dr. Sutton
 Rita Wilson as Arlene Lipschitz
 Sharon Wilkins as Nurse Boo
 Jamie-Lynn Sigler as Hannah Daniels
 Camryn Manheim as Eileen Daniels
 Tom Arnold as Bruce Daniels
 Jon Lovitz as Dennis Lipschitz
 Rachel Fox as Jill Lipschitz
 Wilmer Calderon as Juan
 Dominique Grund as Young Allison Marks
 Elaine Tan as Sala Khan
 Hayes MacArthur as Chuck O'Connell

Production

Casting 
The film was announced on July 15, 2011, with initial cast listings for the film being released concurrently. Sergei and Hewitt led the announcement, with the full cast list, including Moore, Wendie Malick, and Hewitt's former Ghost Whisperer co-star Camryn Manheim, being released on August 8, 2012.

Filming 
Jewtopia began filming in Los Angeles, California, on July 18, 2011, and wrapped on August 10, 2011.

Premiere
The film premiered in April 2012 at the Newport Beach Film Festival.

Reception
On Rotten Tomatoes, the film has a rating of 18% based on reviews from 11 critics.

References

External links 
 

2012 films
2012 independent films
2012 romantic comedy films
American independent films
American romantic comedy films
Films about Jews and Judaism
Films produced by Andy Fickman
Films scored by Nathan Wang
2012 directorial debut films
American films based on plays
2010s English-language films
2010s American films